This is a list of permanent public art in Halifax, Nova Scotia.

The list contains only works of permanent public art freely accessible in public spaces, and not, for example, works inside museums that charge admission, or that are installed for short-term display.

See also
 List of public art in Montreal
 List of public art in Victoria, British Columbia

Further reading

References

Public art
Halifax, Nova Scotia